Madhyamgram Assembly constituency is an assembly constituency in North 24 Parganas district in the Indian state of West Bengal.

Overview
As per orders of the Delimitation Commission, No. 118 Madhyamgram Assembly constituency is composed of the following: Madhyamgram municipality, Chandipur Rohanda, Kemia Khamarpara gram panchayats of Barasat II community development block, and Ichhapur Nilganj, Paschim Khilkapur and Purba Khilkapur gram panchayats of Barasat I community development block.

Madhyamgram Assembly constituency is part of No. 17 Barasat (Lok Sabha constituency).

List of MLAs:-

1)Rathin Ghosh-All India Trinamool Congress {2011-2016}

2)Rathin Ghosh-All India Trinamool Congress {2016-2021}

3)Rathin Ghosh-All India Trinamool Congress {2021-2026}

Members of Legislative Assembly

Election results

2021
In the 2021 election, Rathin Ghosh of Trinamool Congress defeated his nearest rival, Rajasree Rajbanshi of BJP.

2016
In the 2016 election, Rathin Ghosh of Trinamool Congress defeated his nearest rival Tapas Majumdar of Indian National Congress, the coalition candidate.

2011
In the 2011 election, Rathin Ghosh of Trinamool Congress, the United Progressive Alliance (India) candidate, defeated his nearest rival Ranjit Choudhury of Forward Bloc.

References

Assembly constituencies of West Bengal
Politics of North 24 Parganas district